Jones Ice Shelf was the ice shelf occupying the Jones Channel, between the Arrowsmith Peninsula and Blaiklock Island, on the west coast of Graham Land, Antarctica. It was named by the UK Antarctic Place-Names Committee in 1981 in association with the channel.

It started to retreat in the 1970s and by 2003 had completely disappeared.

See also

 Ice shelves of Antarctica

References

Ice shelves of Antarctica
Bodies of ice of Graham Land
Loubet Coast